NayNay may mean:
 Nene (bird)
 Nay nay (hip hop dance move)

 Nay nay Origin - late 20th century: from Pittsburgh, Neigh Neigh